Comanche is a fictional villain appearing in American comic books published by Marvel Comics. He is frequently seen with his partner in crime Shades.

Comanche appeared in the Marvel Cinematic Universe series Luke Cage, played by Thomas Q. Jones.

Publication history
Comanche first appeared in Luke Cage, Hero for Hire #1 (June 1972), created by Archie Goodwin and George Tuska.

Fictional character biography
Born as Darius Jones, Comanche was a young street thug growing up in Harlem where he became a skilled archer and marksman. Comanche was recruited into a gang called the Rivals, which also consisted of Carl Lucas, Willis Stryker, and Shades. As a member of the Rivals, Shades engaged in a fight with a rival gang called the Diablos and many other gangs while also committing petty crimes and working for crime lord Sonny Caputo. Shades and Comanche were later arrested by the police and sentenced to Seagate Prison, where they were tortured by the ruthless prison guard Albert "Billy Bob" Rackham.

After many years of abuse from Albert Rackham, Shades and Comanche escaped from Seagate Prison sometime after Rackham was fired. Shades and Comanche decided that it was the opportunity to get revenge on their former tormentor. Shades and Comanche tried to get Luke Cage to help them in their plot only to learn that he has gone straight.

Shades and Comanche returned and became hoodlums-for-hire where they clashed with Luke Cage and his new partner Iron Fist. Even though they had a past association with Luke Cage, Shades and Comanche indicated that they would kill him if they are ordered to.

Sometime later, Shades and Comanche were hired by Ward Meachum where he gave Shades a visor that shoots energy blasts and gave Comanche some Trick Arrows. The two of them knocked out Ward Meachum where they have the bystanders tell Luke Cage that they have a score to settle when Ward Meachum regains consciousness. Luke Cage and Iron Fist tracked Shades and Comanche to the George Washington Bridge where they learned about their employer. Luke Cage and Iron Fist managed to defeat the two of them as the police arrive. When the police fail to remove Shades' visor, he used one more blast to knock Luke Cage and Iron Fist off the George Washington Bridge. Shades and Comanche were later sprung from prison. The two of them tried to hold off Luke Cage when he attacked the Meachum building only to be defeated when Luke Cage knocked a pillar on them.

Shades was among the several gunmen that were employed by Viktor Smerdilovisc. He and the others came in conflict with the Marvel Knights. Shades was taken down by Cloak and Dagger.

During the Shadowland storyline, Shades and Comanche have gone their separate ways upon Shades going straight. Comanche joined up with Nightshade's Flashmob (which also consisted of Chemistro III, Cheshire Cat, Dontrell Hamilton, Mr. Fish II, and Spear) where they fought Victor Alvarez (the son of Shades) only to be defeated by him with the help of Luke Cage and Iron Fist. After the group was remanded to Ryker's Island, Nightshade's solicitor Big Ben Donovan was able to get Dontrell Hamilton, Mr. Fish, and Spear out while Comanche, Chemistro, and Cheshire Cat had to remain due to them having warrants and/or parole violations.

Powers and abilities
Comanche is an expert hand-to-hand combatant. He is also a skilled archer and marksman, where he even used trick arrows.

In other media
Comanche appears in Luke Cage, portrayed by Thomas Q. Jones. This version is the childhood best friend, later lover of, Shades. Additionally, while serving time in Seagate Prison and working as enforcers for the corrupt warden, Albert Rackham, the pair inadvertently contributed to Luke Cage receiving his powers when they grievously beat him for attempting to expose Rackham. After making minor appearances in flashbacks depicted in the first season, Comanche appears in the second season, having been released from prison before returning to Harlem to reunite with Shades in the present. While working for Mariah Dillard with him however, Comanche butts heads with Shades over the former's loyalty, leading to him secretly leaking information to NYPD Captain Thomas Ridenhour. When Shades discovers Comanche's treachery, the latter kills Ridenhour, but Shades reluctantly kills him in turn, staging it as if Comanche and Ridenhour mutually killed each other.

References

External links
 Comanche at Marvel Wiki
 Comanche at Comic Vine
 

Marvel Comics supervillains
Comics characters introduced in 1972
Fictional gangsters
Marvel Comics male supervillains
Marvel Comics television characters
Fictional archers
Fictional henchmen
Fictional African-American people
Fictional characters from New York City
Fictional LGBT characters in television
Characters created by Archie Goodwin (comics)
Characters created by George Tuska
Luke Cage